Nakoda may refer to:
Nakoda people, an indigenous people in the US and Canada
Nakoda, Rajasthan, a village in India
Nakoda, Maharashtra, a town in India
 Nakodaji, a Jain temple